Nuevas Ideas (Spanish for New Ideas) is a Salvadoran populist political party founded on 25 October 2017 and based in San Salvador. It was founded by the current President of the Republic of El Salvador, Nayib Bukele. It was legalized by the Supreme Electoral Court (TSE) on 24 August 2018. Its first secretary general was Federico Gerardo Anliker who was later succeeded by Xavier Zablah Bukele, a cousin of Nayib Bukele.

It is defined, according to its statutes, as a "democratic, decentralized, plural, and inclusive political party without obsolete ideologies, but at the forefront of the struggle for the recognition of all rights for all citizens, without exclusion or privileges. Among its principles are: building a free El Salvador, defending diversity of thought, a free market and social economy, assuming political activity and the exercise of power as an act of commitment to the country." The party is centrist, rejecting both left and right-wing labels, but it has been described as both center-right and center-left.

History

Foundation 
After the then-mayor of San Salvador, Nayib Bukele, was expelled from the Farabundo Martí National Liberation Front (FMLN) on 10 October 2017, he announced on 25 October through his social networks the foundation of a citizen movement called "Nuevas Ideas", seeking for it to become a political party and thus allowing him to compete in the 2019 presidential elections under its banner. Ultimately, this did not materialize, and Bukele ran a successful one-time campaign under the Grand Alliance for National Unity (GANA).

By legal requirement, Bukele called on his supporters to go to the more than 90 signature collection centers throughout the country to support the creation of the political party. They managed to collect approximately 200,000 signatures in three days.

2021 elections 

Bukele was exceptionally popular among the citizens as he pushed an anti-corruption agenda. According to a survey, 96 percent of respondents said he was doing a "good" or "very good job." El Salvador's legislative elections was an important breakthrough in February 2021. Nuevas Ideas won around two-thirds of votes with its coalition (GANA–Nuevas Ideas). Nuevas Ideas won 56 of the 84 seats in parliament.

2024 elections 

On 15 September 2021, Bukele announced that was seeking reelection in the 2024 general election.

Electoral history

Presidential elections

Legislative Assembly elections

Municipal elections

PARLACEN elections

Presidents of El Salvador

Timeline

Notes

References

Further reading
Vida, Melissa (4 June 2019). Amongst Salvadorans in the US, Opinion Is Split on Conservative New President Nayib Bukele. Remezcla.

External links
 Official website

Political parties in El Salvador
Political parties established in 2018
2018 establishments in El Salvador
Nayib Bukele